The Institute of Hotel Management, Catering Technology and Applied Nutrition (IHMCT&AN), generally known as Institute of Hotel Management (IHM), is a multi-location public hospitality  school in India. IHM is established by the Ministry of Tourism of the Government of India. It is also under the jurisdiction of Ministry of Tourism. It caters to not only the students of India but also international students from the SAARC countries.

Institutes

Central government

State government

Private

Admissions 

National Council for Hotel Management and Catering Technology (Society) was set up in the year 1982 by the Government of India as an autonomous body for coordinated growth and development of hospitality education in the country. National Council of Hotel Management and Catering Technology Joint Entrance Examination or NCHMCT JEE (also known as NHCM JEE) is a national-level entrance exam conducted to offer admission to aspirants in hospitality and hotel administration programs.

Notable alumni 
 Sanjeev Kapoor from Institute of Hotel Management, Delhi 
 Vivek Singh (chef) from Institute of Hotel Management, Delhi 
 Rakesh Sethi (chef) from Institute of Hotel Management, Delhi 
Manjit Gill from Institute of Hotel Management, Delhi 
 Madhulika Liddle from Institute of Hotel Management, Delhi 
 Ranveer Brar from Institute of Hotel Management, Lucknow
 Pankaj Tripathi from Institute of Hotel Management, Hajipur 
 Anjan Chatterjee from Institute of Hotel Management, Kolkata
 Harpal Singh Sokhi from Institute of Hotel Management, Bhubaneswar 
 Sheela Murthy from Institute of Hotel Management, Bangalore
 Soma Valliappan from Institute of Hotel Management, Chennai
 Manish Mehrotra from Institute of Hotel Management, Mumbai
 Thangam Philip  from Institute of Hotel Management, Mumbai
 Farrokh Khambata from Institute of Hotel Management, Mumbai
 Jehangir Mehta from Institute of Hotel Management, Mumbai 
 Sameer Nair from Institute of Hotel Management, Mumbai 
 Piyush Mishra from Institute of Hotel Management, Mumbai 
 Gippy Grewal from Institute of Hotel Management, Panchkula
 Deepak Ohri
 Anoop Suri
 Sandip Soparrkar 
 Rafiq Zakaria from Institute of Hotel Management, Aurangabad

See also 

 Indian Institute of Tourism and Travel Management 
List of institutions of higher education in India

References

External links 

Institute of Hotel Management
Hospitality schools in India